In the 2018 season, the Indonesian football club PSIS Semarang played in Liga 1. Bruno Silva was the top goalscorer.

Squad

Transfer

In

Loan in

Out

Pre-season and friendlies

Competitions

Matches

Squad statistics

Squad & Appearances

References 

PSIS Semarang
PSIS Semarang seasons